Roman Zirnwald (born 25 December 1982) is an Austrian badminton player.

Achievements

BWF International Challenge/Series 
Men's doubles

Mixed doubles

  BWF International Challenge tournament
  BWF International Series tournament
  BWF Future Series tournament

References

External links 
 

1982 births
Living people
People from Sankt Pölten
Austrian male badminton players
Sportspeople from Lower Austria